Víctor Manuel Milke Almagro (born 24 January 1995) is a Mexican professional footballer who plays as a defender.

Career

Youth
Milke joined the youth academy of Querétaro in 2012. Continuing through Gallos Blancos Youth Academy successfully going through U-17, U-20 and Querétaro F.C. Premier. Until finally reaching the first team, Víctor Manuel Vucetich being the coach promoting Milke to first team.

Querétaro
On 27 August 2013, Milke made his official debut with the Querétaro Gallos Blancos in  a Copa MX match against Leones Negros. Milke came in as a substitute at the 79' minute.

He was registered with the first team squad for the 2014 Liga MX Apertura. On May 1, 2015, Milke made his first competitive appearance in the Liga MX against Monarcas Morelia ending in a 2–1 win.

Honours
Querétaro
Copa MX: Apertura 2016
Supercopa MX: 2017

Morelia
Liga de Expansión MX: Clausura 2022

References

1995 births
Living people
Footballers from Mexico City
Mexican footballers
Liga MX players
Atlético Morelia players
Querétaro F.C. footballers
FC Tulsa players
Mexican people of English descent
Mexican people of Spanish descent
Association football central defenders
USL Championship players